The 2017 Canadian Junior Curling Championships was held from January 21 to 29 at the Archie Browning Sports Centre and the Esquimalt Curling Club in Esquimalt, British Columbia. The winners represented Canada at the 2017 World Junior Curling Championships in PyeongChang, Korea.

Men

Round Robin Standings

Championship Pool Standings
After Round Robin Standings

Playoffs

Semifinal

Final

Women

Round Robin Standings
Final Round Robin Standings

Championship Pool Standings
After Round Robin Standings

Playoffs

Semifinal

Final

Qualification

Ontario
The Ontario Junior Provincials were held January 4–8 in Russell, Ontario.

Results:

Playoffs
Men's semifinal: Scott 9-7 Hahn
Men's final: Hall 5-3 Scott
Women's tiebreakers: Auld 7-5 Brandwood; Auld 12-4 Murphy
Women's semifinal: Armstrong 11-9 Auld
Women's final: Armstrong 7-6 Wallingford

References

External links
Official site

Junior Championships
Curling in British Columbia
Sports competitions in Victoria, British Columbia
Canadian Junior Curling Championships
2017 in British Columbia
January 2017 sports events in Canada